Trestan Ebner (born January 2, 1999) is an American football running back and return specialist for the Chicago Bears of the National Football League (NFL). He played college football at Baylor.

Early life and high school
Ebner grew up in Henderson, Texas and attended Henderson High School. As a senior he had 57 receptions for 1,074 yards and 16 touchdowns.

College career
Ebner played in 11 games during his freshman season and rushed for 121 yards and two touchdowns and caught 20 passes for 267 yards and three touchdowns. As a sophomore, he gained 413 yards and scored one touchdown on 69 carries and had 29 receptions for 348 yards and one touchdown. Ebner rushed for 250 yards and three touchdowns as a junior. Ebner assumed Baylor's kickoff return duties as a senior and was named the Big 12 Conference Special Teams Player of the Year after returning 20 kicks for 612 yards and two touchdowns while also rushing for 107 yards and one touchdown and catching 26 passes for 299 yards and three touchdowns. He decided to utilize the extra year of eligibility granted to college athletes who played in the 2020 season due to the coronavirus pandemic and return to Baylor for a fifth season. Ebner repeated as the Big 12 Special Teams Player of the Year as in his fifth season.

Professional career

Ebner was drafted by the Chicago Bears with the 203rd pick in the sixth round of the 2022 NFL Draft.

References

External links
 Chicago Bears bio
Baylor Bears bio

1999 births
Living people
People from Henderson, Texas
Players of American football from Texas
American football running backs
American football return specialists
Baylor Bears football players
Chicago Bears players